Andrej Nolimal (born 1981) is a Slovenian slalom canoeist who competed at the international level from 1998 to 2005.

He won a bronze medal in the K1 team event at the 2005 ICF Canoe Slalom World Championships in Penrith and a gold medal in the same event at the 2005 European Championships in Tacen.

World Cup individual podiums

References

ICF medalists for Olympic and World Championships - Part 2: rest of flatwater (now sprint) and remaining canoeing disciplines: 1936-2007.

Living people
Slovenian male canoeists
1981 births
Medalists at the ICF Canoe Slalom World Championships